Keke may refer to:

People

Given name
 Keke Coutee (born 1995), American football wide receiver
 Keke Geladze (1858–1937), Georgian mother of Joseph Stalin
 Barkevious "KeKe" Mingo (born 1990), American football player 
 Keke Mortson (1934–1995), Canadian ice hockey player
 Keke Palmer (born 1993), American actress
 Keke Rosberg (born 1948), Finnish racing driver
 Keke Wyatt (born 1982), American gospel singer
 Lil' Keke (born 1976), American rapper
 KeKe Luv, the nickname of a DJ at Idaho's KSAS-FM who stayed awake for 175 hours

Surname
 Harold Keke (born 1971), Solomon Islands warlord
 Joseph Keke (1927–2017), Beninese politician
 Kieren Keke (born 1971), Nauruan politician and doctor
 Kingsley Keke (born 1996), American football player 
 Rachel Keke (born 1974), French politician
 Hélène Aholou Keke, lawyer and politician in Benin

Arts and entertainment

Fictional characters
 Keke, a named character in the puzzle game Baba is You

Music
 "Keke" (song), a 2018 song by 6ix9ine, Fetty Wap and A Boogie wit da Hoodie

Mass media
 KEKE (TV), a television station (channel 23, virtual 14) licensed to serve Hilo, Hawaii, United States

Places
 Keke, Mali, a village in the Cercle of Djenné, Mopti Region
 Keke railway station, a station on the Chinese Qingzang Railway

See also
 Kiki (name)
 John Kekes (born 1936), philosophy scholar
 Kékes, Hungary's highest mountain
 Keké, Brazilian fustal player
 Kékéflipnote, French animator also known as "Kéké"